The 2011 Challenger ATP de Salinas Diario Expreso was a professional tennis tournament played on hard courts. It was the 16th edition of the tournament which was part of the 2011 ATP Challenger Tour. It took place in Salinas, Ecuador between February 28 and March 6, 2011.

Singles main-draw entrants

Seeds

 Rankings are as of February 21, 2011.

Other entrants
The following players received wildcards into the singles main draw:
  Arturo Altamirano
  Marcelo Demoliner
  Eric Nunez
  Matías Sborowitz

The following players received entry from the qualifying draw:
  Júlio César Campozano
  Diego Sebastián Schwartzman
  Louk Sorensen
  Stefano Travaglia

Champions

Singles

 Andrés Molteni def.  Horacio Zeballos, 7–5, 7–6(4)

Doubles

 Facundo Bagnis /  Federico Delbonis def.  Rogério Dutra da Silva /  João Souza, 6–2, 6–1

External links
Official Website 
ITF Search
ATP World Tour: Official website

Challenger ATP de Salinas Diario Expreso
Hard court tennis tournaments
Tennis tournaments in Ecuador
Challenger ATP de Salinas Diario Expreso